Greater Oslo Region ("Stor-Oslo-regionen" in Norwegian) is a statistical metropolitan region surrounding the Norwegian capital of Oslo. The region includes the city of Oslo (population: 658,390), the entire county of Akershus (population: 573,326) and several municipalities in the counties of Buskerud (150,709), Oppland (8,552), Vestfold (27,695) and Østfold (102,808).

It is divided into five areas: the city of Oslo (590,041), the Inner Circle of Greater Oslo (309,717), the Outer Circle of Greater Oslo (313,258), Drammen Region (150,655) and Moss Region (54,920).

The total population of these 46 municipalities was 1,546,706 on 1 January 2015. There is also another definition of the Greater Oslo Region, which excludes the Moss and Drammen regions. This definition has 34 municipalities and had a population of 1,323,244 on 1 January 2015.

Statistics

References
of Norway 1. October - Retrieved from Statistics Norway Out of date!

See also 
 Metropolitan regions of Norway
 Viken

 

Metropolitan regions of Norway
Geography of Oslo